The Shaky Beats Music Festival was an annual music festival that took place in Central Park in Atlanta, Georgia. The festival was inaugurated in 2016 and featured largely EDM acts such as Odesza, Major Lazer, Big Gigantic, Porter Robinson, and Carnage. On October 15, 2019, the organizers of the festival announced on their Facebook page that the festival will not be returning in 2020, and will be retired effective immediately. The festival's first iteration hosted a total of 33,000 people. The second Shaky Beats Music Festival ran from May 5–7, 2017 at Centennial Olympic Park and featured acts like The Chainsmokers, Kaskade, and GRiZ.

History

The Shaky Beats Music Festival was founded by Tim Sweetwood as part of Shaky Festivals LLC in 2015. It is the sister festival of the Shaky Knees Music Festival. The lineup for the inaugural 2016 Shaky Beats Music Festival was announced in December 2015. It would essentially fill the void of former Georgia-based EDM festivals, TomorrowWorld and Counterpoint. The initial festival took place from May 20–22, 2016 and hosted around 33,000 attendees in Atlanta's Centennial Olympic Park. In July 2016, it was announced that the festival would be returning to Centennial Olympic Park from May 5–7, 2017. In January 2017, the lineup was announced for the upcoming Shaky Beats Music Festival and included acts like The Chainsmokers, Kaskade, and GRiZ.

2016 festival

The first Shaky Beats Music Festival was held from May 20–22, 2016 in Atlanta's Centennial Olympic Park. Stages and tents from the Shaky Knees Music Festival, which had occurred one week before, were used for the Shaky Beats Festival. Prominent headliners included Major Lazer, Odesza, Big Gigantic, Porter Robinson, Carnage, Nas, Chromeo, and others. A total of 33,000 guests attended the three-day festival.

2016 Dates and Schedule

May 20, 2016

May 21, 2016

May 22, 2016

2017 festival

In July 2016, it was announced that the festival would return to Centennial Olympic Park in Atlanta from May 5–7, 2017. Acts for the upcoming festival were announced in January 2017. The acts include the following:

References

External links
Shaky Beats Official Website
Shaky Knees Official Website

Electronic music festivals in the United States
Hip hop music festivals in the United States
Rock festivals in the United States
Music festivals established in 2016
2016 establishments in Georgia (U.S. state)
Music festivals in Atlanta